Ahi or AHI may refer to:

Organisations and companies 
 Action Health Incorporated
 Adventist Health International
 American Hellenic Institute
  (Association of Independent Comic Creators), an Argentine organisation
 Association for Heritage Interpretation
 Azrak-Hamway, a defunct American toy company
 Independent Herrenian Group (AHI), a Spanish political party in El Hierro

People 
 Ahi (Biblical figure)
 AHI (musician), Canadian singer-songwriter
 Ahi Evren (1169–1261), Turkish Muslim preacher
 Ahmad Ahi (born 1985), Iranian footballer
 Elton Ahi (born 1964), Iranian-American music producer

Places 
 Ahi, Edirne
 Ahi, Kazan, a village in Turkey
 Ahi Beylik, a 14th-century principality in Turkey
 Ahi Subdistrict, a tambon (subdistrict) in Tha Li District, Loei Province, Thailand
 Amahai Airport, Indonesia
 Ahi Rural LLG in Morobe Province, Papua New Guinea

Other uses
 AHI (Amiga), an audio standard
 Ahi (Hinduism), an epithet of Vritra
 Ahi (political party), a political party in Israel
 Ahi language, or Axi, a Loloish language of China
 Apnea–hypopnea index of sleep apnea severity
 Asian Heart Institute, a hospital in Mumbai, India
 Bigeye tuna, one of two fish called ahi in Hawaiian
 Yellowfin tuna, commonly referred to as ahi tuna, from its Hawaiian name
 Tiagba language (ISO 639: ahi), a Kru language of Ivory Coast